Fleurac may refer to the following places in France:

 Fleurac, Charente, a commune of the Charente département
 Fleurac, Dordogne, a commune of the Dordogne département